Zeta Crateris (ζ Crateris) is a probable binary star system  in the southern constellation of Crater. Zeta Crateris appears to be about half-way between Epsilon Corvi to the southeast and Beta Crateris to the northwest, and marks the lower left corner of the rim of the bowl. Eta Crateris lies somewhat less than half of the way from Zeta Crateris to Gamma Corvi,  the bright star above, (north) of Epsilon Corvi.

Zeta Crateris is a photometrically constant system that is visible to the naked eye with an apparent visual magnitude of 4.740. With an annual parallax shift of 9.24 mas as viewed from Earth, Zeta Crateris is located roughly 350 light years from the Sun. At that distance, the visual magnitude of the system is diminished by an extinction factor of 0.21 due to interstellar dust.

The two components of this system had an angular separation of 0.20 arc seconds along a position angle of 22°, as of 1991. The primary, component A, is a magnitude 4.95 evolved giant star with a stellar classification of G8 III. It is a red clump star that is generating energy through the fusion of helium at its core. Zeta Crateris has expanded to 13 times the radius of the Sun and shines with 157 times the Sun's luminosity. This energy is being radiated into outer space from the outer envelope at an effective temperature of 4,992 K.

The secondary, component B, is a magnitude 7.84 star. Zeta Crateris is a confirmed member of the Sirius supercluster and is a candidate member of the Ursa Major Moving Group, a collection of stars that share a similar motion through space and may have at one time been members of the same open cluster.

References

G-type giants
Horizontal-branch stars
Double stars
Ursa Major Moving Group

Crater (constellation)
Crateris, Zeta
Durchmusterung objects
Crateris, 27
057283
102070
4514